The Welsh Short Mat Bowls Association (WSMBA) is the governing body for short mat bowling clubs in Wales. The WSMBA organise national competitions, including league and inter-county, and select and manage the national side.

See also
Welsh Bowls Federation
Welsh Bowling Association
Welsh Crown Green Bowling Association
Welsh Indoor Bowls Association
Welsh Ladies Indoor Bowling Association
Welsh Women’s Bowling Association

References

External links
Official website

Sports governing bodies in Wales
Bowls in Wales